The Hilltop Garden Watercourse Museum is a museum in Shanshang District, Tainan, Taiwan.

History
The museum used to be the old Tainan watercourse and water treatment plant. In 2005, the structure was declared a historic site. The museum opened to the public on 10 October 2019.

Architecture
The museum complex spans over a 20 hectare area.

See also
 List of museums in Taiwan

References

2019 establishments in Taiwan
Drink museums in Taiwan
Museums established in 2019
Museums in Tainan
Water supply and sanitation in Taiwan
National monuments of Taiwan